Thunderhoof may refer to:

Thunderhoof (film), 1948 American film
 Thunderhoof, character from Transformers: Robots in Disguise